Jeron C. Gibson (born November 15, 1982), better known by his mononym Mr. Lucci or sometimes by Lu Diamond, is an American hip hop recording artist, actor and entrepreneur. In 2001, Mr. Lucci released his first album Diabolical, followed by My Life (2004), 100% Real (2007), 10th Anniversary (2010), V.V.S. (2011) and Certified 1ct (2012).

Early life
Born in Lone Star, Texas, Lucci was the son of a preacher and the youngest of three children. After the death of his father, Lucci and his family moved to Dallas. There his interest in music grew as he sat next to a stereo and wrote lyrics to old rap and R&B songs that played, which lead to the development of his writing skills. Lucci's big break came his freshman year when his brother introduced him to the owner of the local barber shop. Craig asked Lucci to rap something, so Lucci freestyle, he asked Lucci to rap once again, so Lucci continued to freestyle. The following day Craig and Kevin A., C.E.O of Iconic Records, asked Lucci's mother for approval to work with the then 15-year-old.

Career
In 1999, at the age of sixteen, Mr. Lucci joined Iconic Records as the youngest member of the label. Kevin A. featured Mr. Lucci on  Mr. Pookie's solo album, Tha Rippla, notably inn the songs "Crook For Life" and "Smoke One", which quickly grew to be crowd favorites across the Southern Region. In 2001, Mr. Lucci released his first solo album, Diabolical, with guest appearances by Mr. Montis, Mr. Pookie and Big Chief and the Iconic Records owner, Kevin A., who used his own production ("Ghetto House Muzik"). The album's popularity was fueled by hits such as the title track "Diabolical" and the popular underground pro-marijuana hit "Getting High". Diabolical sold 50,000+ units. (Diabolical and Tha Rippla still hold the title for most units sold by an independent artist from Dallas, according to Nielsen Sound Scan). A short time later, Mr. Lucci and Mr. Pookie left Iconic Recording to form their own label, Crawl 2 Ball, after a bitter, protracted dispute with the label owner over non-payment of royalties.

In 2003, Mr. Lucci and Mr. Pookie established Stoney Crook Records, an independent record label on which they released both the regular double-disc and the chopped and screwed single-disc versions of My Life (which peaked at #59 on Billboard R&B/Hip-Hop Album Charts in April 2004), selling the CDs hand-to-hand from the trunks of their cars and hand-delivering them personally to small mom-and-pop record stores in Texas, Louisiana, Arkansas and beyond, and moving over 40,000 units by themselves and local distribution. Mr. Lucci, along with Mr. Pookie, also collaborated with Paul Wall in 2004 on "What Cha Gon’ Do", a track on Wall's last independent solo album, Chick Magnet. Mr. Lucci collaborated with Mr. Pookie and Mr. Montis in 2005 on "Don't Test Us" Mr. Pookie's Return of Tha Rippla album, which entered the Billboard charts on the "Hot R&B/Hip-Hop Songs" with a five-week run peeking at #90.

In 2007, Mr. Lucci branched out on his own to release 100% Real with distribution through Select-O-Hits and under the direction of the executive producer Cyber Sapp, a well known producer best known for the Gucci Mane single "Freaky Girl". Sapp's production work on 100% Real includes ″Tough Love″ which features Deonte' from Dallas, "I Like It" featuring Stub-a-lean, "Bout Gone" featuring Bohagon and Twista, "100% Real", "Actin'", "Flippin Through My City" and "Hater Season".

In early 2010, Mr. Lucci and Mr. Pookie reunited for a 10th anniversary album titled Tha Classic, released by their independent Stoney Crook Records. In 2011, with the recent success and positive feedback from their fans, they released solo projects but utilized one another by releasing both albums on the same day and combining their marketing tools as a unit. Both albums were released by Stoney Crook Records. In 2012, Mr. Lucci and Mr. Pookie agreed it was time separate, leaving Stoney Crook Records to Mr. Pookie. Mr. Lucci, along with his business partner, laid the foundation for Star City Music Group on which he released a solo album, Certified 1ct, featuring artists such as Stub-a-lean and Killa Kyleon, distributed by SoSouth.

In 2013, Mr. Lucci collaborated with the Maybach Music Group official DJ A Bay Bay, Dorrough, Big Chief, T.Cash, Pooca Leroy, Young Black and Tum Tum to make their city anthem "I'm From Dallas".

In January 2016, Gibson turned himself in to federal prison on felony drug charges.

Discography 
2001: Diabolical
2004: My Life
2007: 100% Real
2010: 10th Anniversary
2011: V.V.S.
2012: Certified 1ct

Mixtapes

Guest appearances

References

External links
Mr. Lucci Official Site

1982 births
Living people
African-American male rappers
Rappers from Dallas
Universal Music Group
Southern hip hop musicians
21st-century American rappers
21st-century American male musicians
21st-century African-American musicians
20th-century African-American people